Kahduiyeh (also Romanized as Kahdū’īyeh and Kahdooyeh; also known as Khadu and Khātu) is a village in Kahduiyeh Rural District of Garizat District of Taft County, Yazd province, Iran. At the 2006 National Census, its population was 742 in 219 households, when it was in Nir District. The following census in 2011 counted 718 people in 222 households, by which time it was in the newly established Garizat District. The latest census in 2016 showed a population of 589 people in 197 households; it was the largest village in its rural district.

References 

Taft County

Populated places in Yazd Province

Populated places in Taft County